Phool Chand Mullana (born 6 April 1941) is an Indian lawyer and politician. He is a B.A., LL.B. by education. He was elected four times as MLA (in 1972, 1982, 1991 and 2005) from Ambala District to Mullana Assembly constituency. He was a cabinet minister in the Haryana government, handling the portfolios of Revenue, PWD, Education, Forest and Technical Education. He was president of the Haryana Pradesh Congress Committee from 2007 to 2014. He is chairman of the Haryana State Scheduled Caste Commission.

He was awarded Haryana Ratan in 2005 for his contribution in the politics and social welfare of Haryana.

His son Varun Chaudhary is INC MLA in 2019 haryana Vidhan Sabha from Mullana constituency. His daughter Kalpana Kataria is an Indian Revenue Officer and Commissioner of Income Tax and his son in law Sh Rajender Kataria is an IAS officer And presently working as Secretary to Government of Karnataka, Departments of Agriculture, Horticulture & Sericulture.

References

Indian National Congress politicians from Haryana
Living people
Members of the Haryana Legislative Assembly
1941 births